The 2017 Everest Premier League, also abbreviated as 2017 EPL, and branded as TVS EPL 2017 was the second edition of the Everest Premier League, a professional men's domestic Twenty20 cricket competition in Nepal. The tournament was scheduled to be held from 18 December 2017 to 30 December 2017. The tournament featured six teams and their names were based on the cities.

Biratnagar Warriors were undefeated throughout the tournament. They became champions after defeating Bhairahawa Gladiators by 1 run in the final. Babar Hayat became player of the series for scoring highest runs and hitting most sixes in the tournament. Rohit Kumar Paudel was awarded as most valuable player for finishing well in some matches for Bhairahawa Gladiators. Israrullah and Basant Regmi were leading wicket takers in the tournament with 12 wickets.

Background
EPL Pvt Ltd announced the second season of the Everest Premier League on 30 July 2017 at Durbarmarg, Kathmandu. The founder of EPL, Aamir Akhtar disclosed the prize money of 2.1 million rupees to the winner of the tournament. He also announced that the name of the franchise teams will be based on the cities rather than the corporate houses. The logo of the tournament was also unveiled on the ceremony by the Nepalese national team captain, Paras Khadka and the head coach Jagat Tamatta.

Player Auctions
Dipendra Singh Airee, Shakti Gauchan, Sompal Kami, Paras Khadka, Gyanendra Malla and Sharad Vesawkar were selected as marquee players by each teams before the auction. Each teams were allowed to spend Rs. 1 million. The auction was held on 23 October 2017 and 60 players(10 to each teams), categorized as A, B and C were sold to the franchisee. Binod Bhandari, Karan KC, Sandeep Lamichhane and Aarif Sheikh were the expensive players in the auction with the highest bid of Rs.175,000.

Venues

Teams
Each team consisted of 15 players. 10 players were bought by each teams through auction. A talent hunt was conducted by each teams in their respective cities to acquire a young player in their squad. Similarly, the teams also included at least three foreign players in their side. 

 Foreign players are listed in bold.
 Players selected from the talent hunt are listed in italics.

Points table

 The four top ranked teams will qualify for the playoffs
  advanced to Qualifier 1
  advanced to the Eliminator
  Eliminated

League matches

Match 1

Match 2

Match 3

Match 4

Match 5

Match 6

Match 7

Match 8

Match 9

Match 10

Match 11

Match 12

Match 13

Match 14

Match 15

Playoff stage

Preliminary

Qualifier 1

Eliminator

Qualifier 2

Final

Statistics

Most runs 

 Source: Cricinfo

Most wickets 

 Source: Cricinfo

References

External links 

News, Views, Scorecard, Match Reports of Everest Premier League 2017 
https://wicketnepal.com/everest-premier-leagues-fixture-announced-wn017/

Everest Premier League
2017 in Nepalese cricket